The First Zionist Congress was the inaugural congress of the Zionist Organization (ZO) held in Basel, from August 29 to August 31, 1897. 208 delegates and 26 press correspondents attended the event. It was convened and chaired  by  Theodor Herzl, the founder of the modern Zionism movement.  The Congress formulated a Zionist platform, known as the Basel program, and founded the Zionist Organization. It also adopted the  Hatikvah as its anthem (already the anthem of Hovevei Zion and later to become the national anthem of the State of Israel).

The conference was covered by the international press, making a significant impression; the publicity subsequently inspired the antisemitic forgery The Protocols of the Elders of Zion.

History

The first Zionist Congress was convened by Theodor Herzl as a symbolic parliament for the small minority of Jewry in agreement with the implementation of Zionist goals. While Jewish majority indifference or opposition to Zionism would continue until after revelation of the Holocaust in World War II, some proponents point to several directions and streams of this early Jewish opposition. "Alongside the dynamic development of the Zionist movement, which generated waves of enthusiasm throughout the Jewish public, sharp criticism began to appear about Zionism, claiming that Zionism could not hope to resolve the Jewish problem and would only serve to harm the status of Jewish laborers and sabotage its own recognition as an independent class." As a result of the vocal opposition by both the Orthodox and Reform community leadership, the Congress, which was originally planned in Munich, Germany, was transferred to Basel by Herzl.  The Congress took place in the concert hall of the Stadtcasino Basel on August 29, 1897. Proceedings were conducted in German.

Delegates

Herzl acted as chairperson of the Congress, which was attended by some 200 participants from seventeen countries, 69 of whom were delegates from various Zionist societies, and the remainder were individual invitees. Seventeen women attended the Congress, some of them in their own capacity, others accompanying representatives. While women participated in the First Zionist Congress, they did not have voting rights; they were accorded full membership rights at the Second Zionist Congress, the following year.

Over half the delegates were from Eastern Europe, with nearly a quarter coming from Russia.

Herzl was elected President of the Congress, with Max Nordau, Abraham Salz and Samuel Pineles elected first, second and third Vice Presidents respectively.

Agenda

Following a festive opening in which the representatives arrived in formal dress, tails and white tie, the Congress moved to the agenda. The principal items on the agenda were the presentation of Herzl's plans, the establishment of the Zionist Organization and the declaration of Zionism's goals-the Basel program.

According to the 200-page Official Protocol, the three-day conference included the following events:

Day 1: Sunday 29 August
 Karpel Lippe, Jassy delegate, opening speech
 Theodor Herzl, speech
 Max Nordau, Paris delegate, speech
 Abraham Salz, speech
 Jacob de Haas, speech
 Jacques Bahar, speech
 Samuel Pineles, Galați delegate, speech
 Alexander Mintz, Vienna delegate, speech
 Mayer Ebner, speech
 Dr. Rudolf Schauer, Bingen am Rhein delegate, speech
 Professor Gregor Belkovsky, Sofia delegate, speech
 János Rónai, Blaj delegate, speech
 Adam Rosenberg, New York delegate, speech
 Nathan Birnbaum, Vienna delegate, speech
 David Farbstein, Zurich delegate, speech

Day 2: Monday 30 August
 The President, and moderated discussion
 Dr. Max Bodenheimer, Cologne delegate, speech
 Group discussion
 Jacob Bernstein-Kohan, speech
 M. Moses, speech

Day 3: Tuesday 31 August
 Dr. Kaminka, speech
 Adam Rosenberg, speech
 Mordecai Ehrenpreis, speech
 Group discussion

First Zionist Executive
The "Zionist Executive" elected by the First Congress consisted of:
Vienna (5): Theodor Herzl, Moses Schnirer, Oser Kokesch, Johann Kremenezky and Alexander Mintz (the latter in place of Nathan Birmbaum)
Austria (other than Galicia and Bukovina) (1): Dr. Sigmund Kornfeld
Galicia (2):  Abraham Salz, Abraham Adolf Korkis
Bukovina (1): Mayer Ebner
Russia (4): Rabbi Samuel Mohilever, Prof. Max E. Mandelstamm, Jacob Bernstein-Kohan, Isidor Jasinowski
France (2): Bernard Lazare, Jacques Bahar
Romania (2): Karl Lippe, Samuel Pineles
Bulgaria and Serbia (1): Prof. Gregor Belkovsky 
Germany (2): Rabbi Isaac Rülf, Max Bodenheimer

In addition, it was agreed that one representative was to be appointed for each of Britain, America and Palestine. This was proposed to take place later at publicly convened assemblies.

Basel Program

On the second day of its deliberations (August 30), the version submitted to the Congress by a committee under the chair of Max Nordau, it was stated: "Zionism seeks to establish a home for the Jewish people in Palestine secured under public law." This gave clear expression to Herzl's political Zionist vision, in contrast with the settlement orientated activities of the more loosely organized Hovevei Zion. To meet halfway the request of numerous delegates, the most prominent of whom was Leo Motzkin, who sought the inclusion of the phrase "by international law," a compromise formula proposed by Herzl was eventually adopted.

The program, which came to be known as the Basel Program, set out the goals of the Zionist movement.  It was adopted on the following terms:

According to Israel Zangwill it was Max Nordau who came up with the phrase "a publicly and legally assured home" to avoid antagonising the Sultan "too deeply".

Achievements

The First Zionist Congress is credited for the following achievements:
 The formulation of the Zionist platform, (the Basel program, above)
 The foundation of the Zionist Organization
 The adoption of Hatikvah as its anthem
 The absorption of most of the previous Hovevei Zion societies
 The suggestion for the establishment of a people's bank, and
 The election of Herzl as President of the Zionist Organization and Max Nordau one of three vice-presidents.

Theodor Herzl wrote in his diary (September 3, 1897):

Subsequent congresses founded various institutions for the promotion of this program, notably a people's bank known as the Jewish Colonial Trust, which was the financial instrument of political Zionism. Its establishment was suggested at the First Zionist Congress in 1897; the first definite steps toward its institution were taken at the Second Zionist Congress in Cologne, Germany in May, 1898. For the Fifth Zionist Congress, the Jewish National Fund was founded for the purchase of land in Palestine and later the Zionist Commission was founded with subsidiary societies for the study and improvement of the social and economic condition of the Jews within the Land of Israel.

The Zionist Commission was an informal group established by Chaim Weizmann. It carried out initial surveys of Palestine and aided the repatriation of Jews sent into exile by the Ottoman Turks during World War I. It expanded the ZO's Palestine office, which was established in 1907, into small departments for agriculture, settlement, education, land, finance, immigration, and statistics. In 1921, the commission became the Palestine Zionist Executive, which acted as the Jewish Agency, to advise the British mandate authorities on the development of the country in matters of Jewish interest.

The Zionist Congress met every year between 1897 and 1901, then except for war years, every second year (1903–1913, 1921–1939). In 1942, an "Extraordinary Zionist Conference" was held and announced a fundamental departure from traditional Zionist policy with its demand "that Palestine be established as a Jewish  Commonwealth." It became the official Zionist stand on the ultimate aim of the movement. Since the Second World War, meetings have been held approximately every four years and since the creation of the State of Israel, the Congress has been held in Jerusalem.

Gallery

See also

Types of Zionism
World Zionist Congress
Zionist Organization, renamed World Zionist Organization in 1960
Zionism

References

Bibliography

 
 The Jewish Encyclopedia: Basel Program

Jews and Judaism in Basel
World Zionist Congress
Zionists
1897 conferences
1897 in Switzerland
History of Basel